Anna Fidler (born 1973) is an artist and educator living in Corvallis, Oregon.

Biography 
Anna Fidler was born in Traverse City, Michigan. She has a BFA (1995) from Western Michigan University and an MFA (2005) from Portland State University. Fidler studied Visual Art and Creative Writing at Interlochen Arts Academy (1991) and French and Art History at the Alliance Francaise (1993), Paris. She is currently a professor at Oregon State University. Fidler lives in Oregon's Willamette Valley. Fidler had a solo exhibit at the Portland Art Museum in 2012.

Exhibition reviews 
Fidler's exhibitions have been reviewed in Art in America, Artweek and The San Francisco Chronicle.

Collections 
Fidler's work is included in the collections of The Portland Art Museum, and the Portland and Seattle Portable Works Collections.

References

External links 
 

1973 births
Artists from Michigan
Living people
Oregon State University faculty
Western Michigan University alumni
Portland State University alumni
People from Traverse City, Michigan